The East Carolina Pirates football statistical leaders are individual statistical leaders of the East Carolina Pirates football program in various categories, including passing, rushing, receiving, total offense, defensive stats, and kicking. Within those areas, the lists identify single-game, single-season, and career leaders. The Pirates represent East Carolina University in the NCAA Division I FBS American Athletic Conference.

East Carolina began competing in intercollegiate football in 1932. However, these lists are dominated by more recent players for several reasons:
 Since 1932, seasons have increased from 10 games to 11 and then 12 games in length.
 The NCAA didn't allow freshmen to play varsity football until 1972 (with the exception of the World War II years), allowing players to have four-year careers.
 Bowl games only began counting toward single-season and career statistics in 2002. The Pirates have played in eight bowl games since then, and will play in a ninth in 2022, allowing players an extra game to accumulate statistics.
 The recent decade has seen two players set NCAA records: Justin Hardy, who caught 387 passes, more than anyone in all of college football ever had, until fellow Pirate Zay Jones broke the record in 2016. Jones also set the NCAA single-season record with 158 receptions, which is more than all but 2 other East Carolina receivers have ever had in their whole careers.
 Due to COVID-19 issues, the NCAA declared that the 2020 season would not be counted against the athletic eligibility of any football player, giving everyone who played in that season the opportunity for five years of eligibility instead of the normal four.

The most recent East Carolina record books do not list a top 10 in all statistics, sometimes only listing a leader. These lists are updated through the end of the 2022 regular season.

Passing

Passing yards

Passing touchdowns

Rushing

Rushing yards

Rushing touchdowns

Receiving

Receptions

Receiving yards

Receiving touchdowns

Total offense
Total offense is the sum of passing and rushing statistics. It does not include receiving or returns.

Total offense yards

Touchdowns responsible for
"Touchdowns responsible for" is the NCAA's official term for combined passing and rushing touchdowns.

Defense
The East Carolina media guides and record books have historically listed only the top performers in most defensive statistics, rather than a top 10. However, the 2022 record book lists a full top 10 in career tackles.

Interceptions

Tackles

Sacks

Kicking

Field goals made

Field goal percentage
Minimum of 30 attempts for career leadership, and 15 for single-season leadership.

References

Lists of college football statistical leaders by team

Statistical Leaders